Johann Wilhelm Sturm (1808-1865) was German botanist.

Works 
 With Jacob Sturm - Deutschlands Flora in Abbildungen nach der Natur mit beschreibungen - Nuremberg, 1817
 Nymphaea semiaperta Klinggraff, eine fur Bayern neue pflanze, bei Nurnberg aufgefunden - Abhandlungen der Naturhistorischen Gesellschaft zu Nürnberg, Nuremberg, 1858
 Ophioglosseae, Marattiaceae, Osmundaceae, Schizaeaceae, Gleicheniaceae, Hymeanophylleae - in Flora brasiliensis, Leipzig, 1854

References 

19th-century German botanists
1808 births
1865 deaths
Scientists from Nuremberg